John Stephen Jones  (born 24 March 1944) is a British geneticist and from 1995 to 1999 and 2008 to June 2010 was Head of the Department of Genetics, Evolution and Environment at University College London. His studies are conducted in the Galton Laboratory.

He is also a television presenter and a prize-winning author on the subject of biology, especially evolution. He is a popular contemporary writer on evolution. In 1996 his work won him the Michael Faraday Prize "for his numerous, wide ranging contributions to the public understanding of science in areas such as human evolution and variation, race, sex, inherited disease and genetic manipulation through his many broadcasts on radio and television, his lectures, popular science books, and his once-regular science column in The Daily Telegraph and contributions to other newspaper media".

Early life and education
Jones was born in Aberystwyth, Wales, to Lydia Anne and Thomas Gwilym Jones. His parents met as students at the University of Aberystwyth. Until he was about ten years old the family lived alternately at his paternal grandparents' house in New Quay, Ceredigion, and his maternal grandparents' house near Aberystwyth. Later the family moved to the Wirral, returning to Wales for their holidays.

Jones's paternal grandfather and great grandfather were both sea captains. Jones' father, a PhD chemist, worked on detergents such as Jif. Dylan Thomas was an acquaintance of his father. As a child Jones often stayed at his paternal grandparents' home and spent a lot of his time in the attic which contained some seafaring equipment, and boxes of books covering a wide variety of topics, many of which Jones read. He also went to libraries and by the age of 14 years he had read all the works of Charles Dickens.

As a child in Ceredigion Jones spoke a lot of Welsh until he was 6 or 7 years old, and as a keen observer of local wildlife was particularly interested in birds. Jones was a pupil at Wirral Grammar School for Boys. At the age of 13 to 14 years old Jones was inspired to study biology by a school teacher.

Jones was rejected by all the Welsh universities, so he applied to the University of Edinburgh for an undergraduate degree, which had a closing date seven days later, and he was accepted onto a zoology undergraduate course. He stayed on in Edinburgh to do research for a Doctor of Philosophy degree on the ecological genetics of Cepaea, a snail whose shell is polymorphic in colour pattern, making it a model organism for evolutionary biologists. He developed an interest in snails from Bryan Clarke his PhD supervisor.

Career and research
After his PhD, Jones also completed post-doctoral research into the genetics of Drosophila at the University of Chicago to widen his experience. Much of Jones's research has been concerned with snails and the light their study can shed on biodiversity and genetics.

Media and outreach 
Jones was the 1991 Reith Lecturer on BBC Radio, with a series entitled The Language of the Genes, the basis of his 1993 book of the same name.

 Audio podcast: BBC Reith Lectures Archive: 1974 – 2010
 Transcripts: BBC Reith Lectures 1990 – 1999

He presented In the Blood, a six-part TV series on human genetics first broadcast in 1996, see book of same name in bibliography. In July 2011, Jones produced a report dealing with science reporting issues at the BBC. He was critical of the BBC for giving too much space and credence to maverick views on science, including deniers of anthropogenic global warming.

Jones was commissioned by the BBC Trust to write a report on the organisation's science reporting, which was published in July 2011. This was broadly supportive of the BBC's accuracy, impartiality and science coverage although it also made a number of suggestions. These included better interaction of staff across the organisation on science topics and in particular an end to "false balance". Jones describes "[a]ttempts to give a place to anyone, however unqualified, who claims interest can make for false balance: to free publicity to marginal opinions and not to impartiality, but its opposite". The BBC's response to the recommendations was generally positive, several of which it immediately implemented.

Awards and honours
Jones was elected a Fellow of the Royal Society (FRS) in 2012. He won their Michael Faraday Prize in 1996 and delivered the Reith Lectures in 1991. He was elected to the American Philosophical Society in 2011.

Personal life
Jones's life partner since 1977 has been American documentary maker Norma Percy; they married in 2004.

Jones is a patron of Humanists UK and an honorary associate of the National Secular Society. He was awarded the second Irwin Prize for Secularist of the Year by the National Secular Society on 7 October 2006. On 1 January 2011 he became President of The Association for Science Education.

Views on private education
In an interview on the BBC Radio 5 show '5 Live Breakfast' hosted by Nicky Campbell and Shelagh Fogarty on 13 January 2009, Jones described private schools as a "cancer on the education system".
Jones cites private schools as one of the reasons that Britain remains as socially stratified as it is. Among the advantages in private schools compared to state schools, Jones listed smaller classroom sizes, highly trained teachers, better facilities, and coaching through university interviews.

Views on religion
Jones, along with 54 other public figures, signed an open letter published on 15 September 2010 in The Guardian, stating their opposition to Pope Benedict XVI's state visit to the UK. Jones has also stated that creationism is "anti-science" and criticised creationists such as Ken Ham. Jones suggested in a BBC Radio Ulster interview in 2006 that Creationists should be forbidden from being medical doctors because "all of its (Creationism's) claims fly in the face of the whole of science" and he further claimed that no serious biologist can believe in biblical creation. For Jones, 'evolution is the grammar of biology'. Jones elaborated on his full position on creationism in a public lecture entitled 'Why creationism is wrong and evolution is right'.

National Life Stories conducted an oral history interview (C1672/12) with Steve Jones in 2015 for its Science and Religion collection held by the British Library.

Views on human evolution
Jones' view that in humans "Natural selection has to some extent been repealed"
dates back at least to 1991 and has been the focus of a number of newspaper reports and radio interviews. Referring to the title of a public lecture entitled "Is human Evolution Over?" he stated "For those of you who have a train to catch, the answer is "yes", so you can leave now".

His views are largely based on his claim that reduced juvenile mortality, decreasing age of fathers, and decreased geographical isolation of populations in Western societies reduce evolution. Both the data supporting these assertions and his views of the way these factors influence evolution in populations have been extensively criticised by other academics.

Publications
 winner of (Aventis Prize winner)

References

External links
Professor Steve Jones homepage at UCL
Professor Steve Jones biography at Edge.org
Michael Faraday previous winners 2004 – 1986 (inc. Steve Jones)

1944 births
Living people
Genetics education
People from Aberystwyth
Welsh geneticists
Welsh science writers
Alumni of the University of Edinburgh
Academics of University College London
British television presenters
Charles Darwin biographers
Critics of creationism
Fellows of the Royal Society
Fellows of the Royal Society of Literature
People educated at Wirral Grammar School for Boys
Welsh humanists
British secularists
Presidents of the Association for Science Education